Minot is a commune in the Côte-d'Or department in Bourgogne-Franche-Comté in eastern France.

Population

See also
 Communes of the Côte-d'Or département

References

Communes of Côte-d'Or